McNatt is an unincorporated community in north central McDonald County, in the U.S. state of Missouri.

The community is located adjacent to Indian Creek along Missouri Route C.

History
A post office called McNatt was established in 1901, and remained in operation until 1907. J. J. McNatt was the proprietor of a mill near the original town site.

References

Unincorporated communities in McDonald County, Missouri
Unincorporated communities in Missouri